Fact-checking is the process of verifying the factual accuracy of questioned reporting and statements. Fact-checking can be conducted before (ante hoc) or after (post hoc) the text or content is published or otherwise disseminated. Internal fact-checking is such checking done in-house by the publisher to prevent inaccurate content from being published; when the text is analyzed by a third party, the process is called external fact-checking.

Research suggests that fact-checking can indeed correct perceptions among citizens, as well as discourage politicians from spreading false or misleading claims. However, corrections may decay over time or be overwhelmed by cues from elites who promote less accurate claims. Political fact-checking is sometimes criticized as being opinion journalism. A review of US politics fact-checkers shows a mixed result of whether fact-checking is an effective way to reduce misconceptions, and whether the method is reliable.

History of fact-checking 
Sensationalist newspapers in the 1850s and later led to a gradual need for a more factual media. Colin Dickey has described the subsequent evolution of fact-checking. Key elements were the establishment of Associated Press in the 1850s (short factual material needed), Ralph Pulitzer of the New York World (his Bureau of Accuracy and Fair Play, 1912), Henry Luce and Time magazine (original working title: Facts), and the famous fact-checking department of The New Yorker. More recently, the mainstream media has come under severe economic threat from online startups. In addition the rapid spread of misinformation and conspiracy theories via social media is slowly creeping into mainstream media. One solution is for more media staff to be assigned a fact-checking role, as for example The Washington Post. Independent fact-checking organisations have also become prominent, such as Politifact.

Types of fact-checking 

Ante hoc fact-checking aims to identify errors so that the text can be corrected before dissemination, or perhaps rejected. Post hoc fact-checking is most often followed by a written report of inaccuracies, sometimes with a visual metric provided by the checking organization (e.g., Pinocchios from The Washington Post Fact Checker, or TRUTH-O-METER ratings from PolitiFact). Several organizations are devoted to post hoc fact-checking: examples include FactCheck.org and PolitiFact in the US, and Full Fact in the UK.

External post hoc fact-checking organizations first arose in the US in the early 2000s, and the concept grew in relevance and spread to various other countries during the 2010s.

Post hoc fact-checking 
External post hoc fact-checking by independent organizations began in the United States in the early 2000s. In the 2010s, particularly following the 2016 election of Donald Trump as US President, fact-checking gained a rise in popularity and spread to multiple countries mostly in Europe and Latin America. However, the US remains the largest market for fact-checking.

Consistency across fact-checkers 
One study finds that fact-checkers PolitiFact, FactCheck.org, and The Washington Post's Fact Checker overwhelmingly agree on their evaluations of claims. However, a study by Morgan Marietta, David C. Barker and Todd Bowser found "substantial differences in the questions asked and the answers offered." They concluded that this limited the "usefulness of fact-checking for citizens trying to decide which version of disputed realities to believe." A paper by Chloe Lim, PhD student at Stanford University, found little overlap in the statements that fact-checkers check. Out of 1,178 fact-checks by PolitiFact and 325 fact-checks by The Washington Posts Fact Checker, there were only 77 statements that both fact-checkers checked. The study found that the fact-checkers gave the same ratings for 49 and close ratings for 22 out of 77 statements, about 92% agreement. Lim concluded, "At least in some cases, the strategic ambiguity of politicians may impede the fact-checking movement's goals."
The process of fact-checking is sometimes questionable, partly because the fact-checkers are just human subjects, and also because the purpose of some instances of fact-checking was unclear.

Effects 
Studies of post hoc fact-checking have made clear that such efforts often result in changes in the behavior, in general, of both the speaker (making them more careful in their pronouncements) and of the listener or reader (making them more discerning with regard to the factual accuracy of content); observations include the propensities of audiences to be completely unswayed by corrections to errors regarding the most divisive subjects, or the tendency to be more greatly persuaded by corrections of negative reporting (e.g., "attack ads"), and to see minds changed only when the individual in error was someone reasonably like-minded to begin with.

Correcting misperceptions 

Studies have shown that fact-checking can affect citizens' belief in the accuracy of claims made in political advertisement. A 2020 study by Paris School of Economics and Sciences Po economists found that falsehoods by Marine Le Pen during the 2017 French presidential election campaign (i) successfully persuaded voters, (ii) lost their persuasiveness when fact-checked, and (iii) did not reduce voters' political support for Le Pen when her claims were fact-checked. A 2017 study in the Journal of Politics found that "individuals consistently update political beliefs in the appropriate direction, even on facts that have clear implications for political party reputations, though they do so cautiously and with some bias... Interestingly, those who identify with one of the political parties are no more biased or cautious than pure independents in their learning, conditional on initial beliefs."

A study by Yale University cognitive scientists Gordon Pennycook and David G. Rand found that Facebook tags of fake articles "did significantly reduce their perceived accuracy relative to a control without tags, but only modestly". A Dartmouth study led by Brendan Nyhan found that Facebook tags had a greater impact than the Yale study found. A "disputed" tag on a false headline reduced the number of respondents who considered the headline accurate from 29% to 19%, whereas a "rated false" tag pushed the number down to 16%. A 2019 study found that the "disputed" tag reduced Facebook users' intentions to share a fake news story. The Yale study found evidence of a backfire effect among Trump supporters younger than 26 years whereby the presence of both untagged and tagged fake articles made the untagged fake articles appear more accurate. In response to research which questioned the effectiveness of the Facebook "disputed" tags, Facebook decided to drop the tags in December 2017 and would instead put articles which fact-checked a fake news story next to the fake news story link whenever it is shared on Facebook.

Based on the findings of a 2017 study in the journal Psychological Science, the most effective ways to reduce misinformation through corrections is by:
 limiting detailed descriptions of / or arguments in favor of the misinformation; 
 walking through the reasons why a piece of misinformation is false rather than just labelling it false; 
 presenting new and credible information which allows readers to update their knowledge of events and understand why they developed an inaccurate understanding in the first place; 
 using video, as videos appear to be more effective than text at increasing attention and reducing confusion, making videos more effective at correcting misperception than text.

Large studies by Ethan Porter and Thomas J. Wood found that misinformation propagated by Donald Trump was more difficult to dispel with the same techniques, and generated the following recommendations:
 Highly credible sources are the most effective, especially those which surprisingly report facts against their own perceived bias
 Reframing the issue by adding context can be more effective than simply labeling it as incorrect or unproven.
 Challenging readers' identity or worldview reduces effectiveness.
 Fact-checking immediately is more effective, before false ideas have spread widely.

A 2019 meta-analysis of research into the effects of fact-checking on misinformation found that fact-checking has substantial positive impacts on political beliefs, but that this impact weakened when fact-checkers used "truth scales", refuted only parts of a claim and when they fact-checked campaign-related statements. Individuals' preexisting beliefs, ideology, and knowledge affected to what extent the fact-checking had an impact. A 2019 study in the Journal of Experimental Political Science found "strong evidence that citizens are willing to accept corrections to fake news, regardless of their ideology and the content of the fake stories."

A 2018 study found that Republicans were more likely to correct their false information on voter fraud if the correction came from Breitbart News rather than a non-partisan neutral source such as PolitiFact. A 2022 study found that individuals exposed to a fact-check of a false statement by a far-right politician were less likely to share the false statement.

Some studies have found that exposure to fact-checks had durable effects on reducing misperceptions, whereas other studies have found no effects.

Scholars have debated whether fact-checking could lead to a "backfire effect" whereby correcting false information may make partisan individuals cling more strongly to their views. One study found evidence of such a "backfire effect", but several other studies did not.

Political discourse 
A 2015 experimental study found that fact-checking can encourage politicians to not spread misinformation. The study found that it might help improve political discourse by increasing the reputational costs or risks of spreading misinformation for political elites. The researchers sent, "a series of letters about the risks to their reputation and electoral security if they were caught making questionable statements. The legislators who were sent these letters were substantially less likely to receive a negative fact-checking rating or to have their accuracy questioned publicly, suggesting that fact-checking can reduce inaccuracy when it poses a salient threat."

Political preferences 
One experimental study found that fact-checking during debates affected viewers' assessment of the candidates' debate performance and "greater willingness to vote for a candidate when the fact-check indicates that the candidate is being honest."

A study of Trump supporters during the 2016 presidential campaign found that while fact-checks of false claims made by Trump reduced his supporters' belief in the false claims in question, the corrections did not alter their attitudes towards Trump.

A 2019 study found that "summary fact-checking", where the fact-checker summarizes how many false statements a politician has made, has a greater impact on reducing support for a politician than fact-checking of individual statements made by the politician.

Informal fact-checking 
Individual readers perform some types of fact-checking, such as comparing claims in one news story against claims in another.

Rabbi Moshe Benovitz, has observed that: "modern students use their wireless worlds to augment skepticism and to reject dogma." He says this has positive implications for values development:

According to Queen's University Belfast researcher Jennifer Rose, because fake news is created with the intention of misleading readers, online news consumers who attempt to fact-check the articles they read may incorrectly conclude that a fake news article is legitimate. Rose states, "A diligent online news consumer is likely at a pervasive risk of inferring truth from false premises", and suggests that fact-checking alone is not enough to reduce fake news consumption. Despite this, Rose asserts that fact-checking "ought to remain on educational agendas to help combat fake news".

Detecting fake news 

Fake news has become increasingly prevalent over the last few years, with the 2016 election revealing that online media platforms were especially susceptible to disseminating disinformation and misinformation. Fake news articles tend to come from satirical news websites or individual websites with an incentive to propagate false information, either as clickbait or to serve a purpose. Since these articles typically hope to intentionally promote biased or incorrect information, these articles are difficult to detect. When identifying a source of information, one must look at many attributes, including but not limited to the content of the email and social media engagements. The language, specifically, is typically more inflammatory in fake news than real articles, in part because the purpose is to confuse and generate clicks. Furthermore, modeling techniques such as n-gram encodings and bag of words have served as other linguistic techniques to determine the legitimacy of a news course. On top of that, researchers have determined that visual-based cues also play a factor in categorizing an article, specifically some features can be designed to assess if a picture was legitimate, and provides us more clarity on the news. There is also many social context features that can play a role, as well as the model of spreading the news. Websites such as "Snopes" try to detect this information manually, while certain universities are trying to build mathematical models to do this themselves.

Some individuals and organizations publish their fact-checking efforts on the internet. These may have a special subject-matter focus, such as Snopes.com's focus on urban legends or the Reporters' Lab at Duke University's focus on providing resources to journalists.

Fake news and social media 
The adaptation of social media as a legitimate and commonly used platform has created extensive concerns for fake news in this domain. The spread of fake news via social media platforms such as Facebook, Twitter and Instagram presents the opportunity for extremely negative effects on society therefore new fields of research regarding fake news detection on social media is gaining momentum. However, fake news detection on social media presents challenges that renders previous data mining and detection techniques inadequate. As such, researchers are calling for more work to be done regarding fake news as characterized against psychology and social theories and adapting existing data mining algorithms to apply to social media networks. Further, multiple scientific articles have been published urging the field further to find automatic ways in which fake news can be filtered out of social media timelines.

Ongoing research in fact-checking and detecting fake news 

Since the 2016 United States presidential election, fake news has been a popular topic of discussion by President Trump and news outlets. The reality of fake news had become omnipresent, and a lot of research has gone into understanding, identifying, and combating fake news. Also, a number of researchers began with the usage of fake news to influence the 2016 presidential campaign. One research found evidence of pro-Trump fake news being selectively targeted on conservatives and pro-Trump supporters in 2016. The researchers found that social media sites, Facebook in particular, to be powerful platforms to spread certain fake news to targeted groups to appeal to their sentiments during the 2016 presidential race. Additionally, researchers from Stanford, NYU, and NBER found evidence to show how engagement with fake news on Facebook and Twitter was high throughout 2016.

Recently, a lot of work has gone into helping detect and identify fake news through machine learning and artificial intelligence. In 2018, researchers at MIT's CSAIL created and tested a machine learning algorithm to identify false information by looking for common patterns, words, and symbols that typically appear in fake news. More so, they released an open-source data set with a large catalog of historical news sources with their veracity scores to encourage other researchers to explore and develop new methods and technologies for detecting fake news.

In 2022, researchers have also demonstrated the feasibility of falsity scores for popular and official figures by developing such for over 800 contemporary elites on Twitter as well as associated exposure scores.

There are also demonstrations of platform-built-in (by-design) as well browser-integrated (currently in the form of addons) misinformation mitigation. Efforts such as providing and viewing structured accuracy assessments on posts "are not currently supported by the platforms". Trust in the default or, in decentralized designs, user-selected providers of assessments (and their reliability) as well as the large quantities of posts and articles are two of the problems such approaches may face. Moreover, they can not mitigate misinformation in chats, print-media and TV.

International Fact-Checking Day
The concept for International Fact-Checking Day was introduced at a conference for journalists and fact-checkers at the London School of Economics in June 2014. The holiday was officially created in 2016 and first celebrated on April 2, 2017. The idea for International Fact-Checking day rose out of the many misinformation campaigns found on the internet, particularly social media sites. It rose in importance after the 2016 elections, which brought fake news, as well as accusations of it, to the forefront of media issues. 
The holiday is held on April 2 because "April 1 is a day for fools. April 2 is a day for facts."
Activities for International Fact-Checking Day consist of various media organizations contributing to fact-checking resources, articles, and lessons for students and the general public to learn more about how to identify fake news and stop the spread of misinformation. 
2020's International Fact-Checking Day focused specifically on how to accurately identify information about COVID-19.

Controversies 

Political fact-checking is increasingly criticized as being opinion journalism. Criticism has included that fact-checking organizations in themselves are biased or that it is impossible to apply absolute terms such as "true" or "false" to inherently debatable claims. In September 2016, a Rasmussen Reports national telephone and online survey found that "just 29% of all Likely U.S. Voters trust media fact-checking of candidates' comments. Sixty-two percent (62%) believe instead that news organizations skew the facts to help candidates they support."

A paper by Andrew Guess (of Princeton University), Brendan Nyhan (Dartmouth College) and Jason Reifler (University of Exeter) found that consumers of fake news tended to have less favorable views of fact-checking, in particular Trump supporters. The paper found that fake news consumers rarely encountered fact-checks: "only about half of the Americans who visited a fake news website during the study period also saw any fact-check from one of the dedicated fact-checking website (14.0%)."

Deceptive websites that pose as fact-checkers have also been used to promote disinformation; this tactic has been used by both Russia and Turkey.

During the COVID-19 pandemic, Facebook announced it would "remove false or debunked claims about the novel coronavirus which created a global pandemic", based on its fact-checking partners, collectively known as the International Fact-Checking Network. In 2021, Facebook reversed its ban on posts speculating the COVID-19 disease originated from Chinese labs, following developments in the investigations into the origin of COVID-19, including claims by the Biden administration, and a letter by eighteen scientists in the journal Science, saying a new investigation is needed because 'theories of accidental release from a lab and zoonotic spillover both remain viable." The policy led to an article by The New York Post that suggested a lab leak would be plausible to be initially labeled as "false information" on the platform. This reignited debates into the notion of scientific consensus. In an article published by the medical journal The BMJ, journalist Laurie Clarke said "The contentious nature of these decisions is partly down to how social media platforms define the slippery concepts of misinformation versus disinformation. This decision relies on the idea of a scientific consensus. But some scientists say that this smothers heterogeneous opinions, problematically reinforcing a misconception that science is a monolith." David Spiegelhalter, the Winton Professor of the Public Understanding of Risk at Cambridge University, argued that "behind closed doors, scientists spend the whole time arguing and deeply disagreeing on some fairly fundamental things". Clarke further argued that "The binary idea that scientific assertions are either correct or incorrect has fed into the divisiveness that has characterised the pandemic."

Pre-publication fact-checking 
Among the benefits of printing only checked copy is that it averts serious, sometimes costly, problems. These problems can include lawsuits for mistakes that damage people or businesses, but even small mistakes can cause a loss of reputation for the publication. The loss of reputation is often the more significant motivating factor for journalists.

Fact checkers verify that the names, dates, and facts in an article or book are correct. For example, they may contact a person who is quoted in a proposed news article and ask the person whether this quotation is correct, or how to spell the person's name. Fact-checkers are primarily useful in catching accidental mistakes; they are not guaranteed safeguards against those who wish to commit journalistic frauds.

As a career 
Professional fact checkers have generally been hired by newspapers, magazines, and book publishers, probably starting in the early 1920s with the creation of Time magazine in the United States, though they were not originally called "fact-checkers". Fact checkers may be aspiring writers, future editors, or freelancers engaged other projects; others are career professionals.

Historically, the field was considered women's work, and from the time of the first professional American fact checker through at least the 1970s, the fact checkers at a media company might be entirely female or primarily so.

The number of people employed in fact-checking varies by publication. Some organizations have substantial fact-checking departments. For example, The New Yorker magazine had 16 fact checkers in 2003 and the fact checking department of the German weekly magazine Der Spiegel counted 70 staff in 2017. Others may hire freelancers per piece, or may combine fact-checking with other duties. Magazines are more likely to use fact checkers than newspapers. Television and radio programs rarely employ dedicated fact checkers, and instead expect others, including senior staff, to engage in fact-checking in addition to their other duties.

Checking original reportage
Stephen Glass began his journalism career as a fact-checker. He went on to invent fictitious stories, which he submitted as reportage, and which fact-checkers at The New Republic (and other weeklies for which he worked) never flagged. Michael Kelly, who edited some of Glass's concocted stories, blamed himself, rather than the fact-checkers, saying: "Any fact-checking system is built on trust ... If a reporter is willing to fake notes, it defeats the system. Anyway, the real vetting system is not fact-checking but the editor."

Education on fact-checking 
With the circulation of fake news on the internet, many organizations have dedicated time to create guidelines to help read to verify the information they are consuming. Many universities across America provide university students resources and tools to help them verify their sources. Universities provide access to research guides that help students conduct thorough research with reputable sources within academia. Organizations like FactCheck.org, OntheMedia.org, and PolitiFact.com provide procedural guidelines that help individuals navigate the process to fact-check a source.

MIT and Stanford began an online MOOC course in the fall of 2020 called Sorting Truth From Fiction: Civic Online Reasoning. This course is for educators that want to teach students how to do basic fact-checking.

Books on professional fact-checking
 Sarah Harrison Smith spent some time and also headed the fact-checking department for The New York Times. She is the author of the book, The Fact Checker's Bible.
 Jim Fingal worked for several years as a fact-checker at The Believer and McSweeney's and is co-author with John D'Agata of The Lifespan of a Fact which is an inside look at the struggle between fact-checker (Fingal) and author (D'Agata) over an essay that pushed the limits of the acceptable "artistic license" for a non-fiction work.

Alumni of the role 

The following is a list of individuals for whom it has been reported, reliably, that they have played such a fact-checking role at some point in their careers, often as a stepping point to other journalistic endeavors, or to an independent writing career:

 Susan Choi – American novelist
 Anderson Cooper – Television anchorman
 William Gaddis – American novelist
 Virginia Heffernan – The New York Times television critic
 Roger Hodge – Former editor, Harper's Magazine
 David D. Kirkpatrick – The New York Times reporter
 Sean Wilsey – McSweeney's Editor and memoirist

See also 

 Cherry picking
 Confirmation bias
 
 Fact-checking on social media
 Firehosing
 Section 230 of the Communications Decency Act
 
 
 Metascience#Science education

References

Further reading 
 The Poynter Institute's summary of research on fact-checking.
 
 
 
 Lewis-Kraus, Gideon (2012). "RIFF: The fact-checker versus the fabulist", The New York Times Magazine (online), 21 February 2012 (print edition, 26 February 2012, p. MM45, title, "I Have Taken Some Liberties")
 See: 
 Heffernan, Virginia (2010) "The Medium: What 'fact-checking' means online," The New York Times Magazine (online), 20 August 2010 (print edition, 22 August 2010, p. MM14). Accessed 27 July 2015.
 Silverman, Craig (2010) "Top fact checkers and news accuracy experts gather in Germany," Regret the Error (online), 4 September 2010
 See:
  accessed 28 July 2015. Cited by Tobias Reitz & Kersten Alexander Riechers (2011) "Quo vadis Qualitätssicherung? Corrigo, Konzeption eines Crowdsourced Media Accountability Services", p. 151, Fachbereich Media, 31 May 2011 (Hochschule Darmstadt, University of Applied Sciences)
 </ref> accessed 28 July 2015.
 Bergstrom, Carl T. and Jevin West. "Calling Bullshit: Data Reasoning in a Digital World." Online Lecture INFO 198 / BIOL 106B, 2017, University of Washington.
 
 
 
 
 </ref>
 
 
 Nyhan, Brendan. 2020. "Facts and Myths about Misperceptions". Journal of Economic Perspectives, 34 (3): 220–36.

External links

 Duke Reporters Lab
 Example of fact-checking with image of fact-checker's notes from ProPublica

Copy editing
Journalism occupations
Knowledge industry
Newswriting
Truth
Watchdog journalism